Fritillaria pallidiflora is an Asian species of bulbous flowering plant in the lily family Liliaceae, native to Xinjiang, Kyrgyzstan and Kazakhstan. The common name frequently used is Siberian fritillary, a misnomer because the species does not grow in the wild in Siberia.

The Latin specific epithet pallidiflora means “pale flowered”.

In cultivation in the UK this plant has gained the Royal Horticultural Society’s Award of Garden Merit. It is hardy down to

References

External links
Pacific Bulb Society, Asian Fritillaria Three photos of several species including Fritillaria pallidiflora
Vasteplanten Kwekerij De Hessenhof, Fritillaria pallidiflora  photo of cultivated specimen in Netherlands

pallidiflora
Flora of Asia
Plants described in 1841